The Mandé peoples are ethnic groups who are speakers of Mande languages. Various Mandé speaking ethnic groups are found particularly toward the west of West Africa.  The Mandé Speaking languages are divided into two primary groups: East Mandé and West Mandé.

The Mandinka or Manding (Malinke, Bambara and Dioula), a western branch of the Mandé, are credited with the founding of the largest ancient West African empires. Other large Mandé speaking ethnicities include the Soninke and Susu as well as smaller ethnic groups such as the Ligbi, Vai, and Bissa.

Mandé speaking people inhabit the sparse Sahel. They have a wide range of cuisines, cultures, and beliefs, and are organized mainly by their language group. Today they are predominantly Muslim and follow a caste system. 

Islam has played a central role in identifying the Mandé speaking people who originate and live in the Sahel regions the Mandinka and Soninke who have been described as transcending individual tribal affiliations. influences from Mandé speaking people have historically spread far beyond immediate areas to other neighboring Muslim West Africans groups who inhabited the sahel and savanna. The Mandé speaking people conducted increased trade down the River Niger or overland, and achieved military conquest with the expansion of the Ghana Empire, Mali Empire, and Kaabu and Wassoulou states. 

The non-Mande-speaking Fula, Songhai, Wolof, Hausa, and Voltaic peoples maintain varying degrees of close alignment with the Mandé speaking peoples worldview, clothing and other cultural artefacts (a shared written script, architecture, cuisine, and social norms).

History

Prehistory 
Descended from ancient central Saharan people, the Mandé speaking peoples constitute an identifiable language family, with associated peoples spread throughout West Africa. The Mande speaking peoples are known as having been early producers of woven textiles, by a process known as strip-weaving. The Mandé speaking people have been credited with the independent development of agriculture by about 4,000–3,000 BC. This agricultural base stimulated the development of some of the earliest and most complex civilizations of Western Africa.

Mande Speaking peoples founded the Ghana (Soninke) and Mali (Mandinka) empires.

Archaeological evidence shows that the Mandé Speaking people were early producers of stone settlement civilizations. These were initially built on the rocky promontories of Tichitt-Walata and Dhar Néma in the Tagant cliffs of Southern Mauritania beginning between around 2,000 BC and 1,500 BC by ancient Mande speaking people, likely early Soninke, peoples. Hundreds of stone masonry settlements, with clear street layouts, have been found in this area. Some settlements had massive defensive walls, while others were less fortified.

In a now arid environment where arable land and pasturage were once at a premium, the population grew. Relatively large-scale political organizations emerged, leading to the development of military hierarchical aristocracies. The agro-pastoral society had a mixed farming economy of millet production combined with the rearing of livestock. They had learned how to work with copper. They traded in jewelry and semi-precious stones from distant parts of the Sahara and Sahel. They are believed to be the first to domesticate African rice. An archaeologist described their ancient, abandoned sites as representing "a great wealth of rather spectacular prehistoric ruins".

A series of early cities and towns were created by Mande peoples, also related to the Soninke, along the middle Niger River in Mali, including at Dia, beginning from around 900 BC, and reaching its peak around 600 BC, and later at Djenné-Djenno, which was occupied from around 250 B.C to around 800 AD. Djenné-Djenno comprised an urban complex consisting of 40 mounds within a 4 kilometer radius.   
The site is believed to exceed 33 hectares (82 acres), and the town engaged in both local and long-distance trade During Djenné-Djenno's second phase (during the first millennium AD) the borders of the site expanded during (possibly covering 100,000 square meters or more), also coinciding with the development at the site of a kind of permanent mud brick architecture, including a city wall, probably built during the latter half of the first millennium AD using the cylindrical brick technology, "which was 3.7 meters wide at its base and ran almost two kilometers around the town". who are bards, storytellers, and oral historians.

Religion

Many of the Mandé speaking ethnic groups in the westernmost part of West Africa have been predominantly Muslim since as early as the 13th century. Others, such as the Bambara a Mandinka group, converted to Islam as late as the 19th century with some retaining their traditional beliefs. Muslim Mandinka also hold traditional beliefs, such as in the rituals of initiation groups like Chiwara, and Dwo, and beliefs in the power of nyama (a spiritual power existing in nature). Many smaller Mande speaking ethnic groups, such as the Bobo, retain pre-Islamic belief systems in their entirety. Many Mande-speaking groups in Sierra Leone and Liberia were also, for the most part, not islamized.

According to oral histories, Mandé speaking people, in particular the Soninke ethnic group, contributed through trade and settlement to the Islamization of non-Mandé Gur groups at the edge of the Sahel in West Africa.

Arts
Much Mandé art is in the form of jewelry and carvings. The masks associated with the fraternal and sorority associations of the Marka and the Mendé are probably the best-known, and finely crafted in the region. The Mandé also produce beautifully woven fabrics which are popular throughout western Africa. They also create gold and silver necklaces, bracelets, armlets, and earrings. The Bambara people and related groups also traditionally produce wooden sculpture. And sculpture in wood, metal, and terra-cotta, have been found, associated with ancient peoples related to the Soninke in Mali.

The bells on the necklaces are of the type believed to be heard by spirits, ringing in both worlds, that of the ancestors and the living. Mandé hunters often wear a single bell, which can be easily silenced when stealth is necessary. Women, on the other hand, often wear multiple bells, representative of concepts of community, since the bells ring harmoniously together.

Djenné-Djenno, an ancient city on the Niger River in central Mali built by Soninke-related peoples, is famous for its terracotta figurines which depict humans and animals including snakes and horses, some dating to the first millennium and early second millennium AD.  It is believed that these statuettes served a ritual function and hypothesized that some are the representations of household or ancestral spirits, as ancestral cults are known to have flourished in the area as late as the 20th century.

Music
The best known  type of traditional music Amongst the Mande speaking people is played on the kora, a stringed instrument with 21 or more strings mainly associated by the Mandinka people. It is performed by families of musicians known in Mandinka as Jeliw (sing. Jeli), or in French as griots. The kora is a unique harp-lute with a notched wooden bridge. It is arguably the most complex chordophone of Africa.

The N'goni is the ancestor of the modern banjo, and is also played by jelis.

Griots are professional bards in northern West Africa, keepers of their great oral epic traditions and history. They are trusted and powerful advisors of Mandinka leaders. Among the most celebrated of these today are Toumani Diabate, Mamadou Diabate, and Kandia Kouyaté.

See also
 Griot
 Djembe
 N'goni 
 Kora (instrument)
 List of Mandé peoples of Africa
 Mande Studies Association
 Mande languages

References and sources
 References

 Sources
 Gillow, John. (2003), African Textiles. 29 p.
 Metropolitan Museum of Art's collection of Arts of Africa, Oceania, and the Americas.
 UNESCO General History of Africa, Volume IV, pp. 197–200.
 Mauny, R. (1971), “The Western Sudan” in Shinnie: 66-87.
 Monteil, Charles (1953), “La Légende du Ouagadou et l’Origine des Soninke” in Mélanges Ethnologiques (Dakar: Bulletin del’Institut Francais del’Afrique Noir).
 Fage, John D. (2001), History of Africa. Routledge; 4th edition.
 Boone, Sylvia Ardyn.  (1986), Radiance from the Waters.
 Kouyaté, Dani (Director). (1995). Keïta: Heritage of a Griot [Motion picture]. Burkina Faso.
 Kevin C. MacDonald, Robert Vernet, Marcos Martinón-Torres & Dorian Q. Fuller. "Dhar Néma: from early agriculture to metallurgy in southeastern Mauritania"/https://www.tandfonline.com/doi/abs/10.1080/00671990902811330

Mandé people

es:Mandinga